20s may refer to:
 1820s
 1920s
 2020s

See also
20s, a decade in the 1st century AD
20s BC, a decade in the 1st century BC